Away with Words (known also by its Chinese title 三條人, roughly translated as Three Life-stories, and its Japanese title 孔雀, translated as Peacock) is a 1999 auteur trilingual (Japanese, English, Cantonese) film by Christopher Doyle co-scripted by Doyle and Tony Rayns and starring Tadanobu Asano, Kevin Sherlock and Mavis Xu.

The film, shot in a jazzy, free-wheeling style and featuring Doyle's signature hyper-kinetic, oversaturated photography and eccentric humor, focuses on a trip that Asano's character takes to Hong Kong and his encounters with off-beat personalities populating the metropolitan landscape (among them, a beer-drinking amnesiac gay bar owner portrayed by Kevin Sherlock). Another narrative thread relies on flashbacks into Asano's character's childhood in Okinawa. The protagonist suffers from overbearing excesses of his memory, mnemonic associations and synesthesia. The emerging human attachments provide an emotional center and a source of serenity to offset the rampage of the protagonist's mind and tame the lavish disarray of urban imagery.

The film credits Borges (presumably Funes the Memorious) and Luria for inspiration. Many aspects of Asano's character (memory excess, profound synesthesia, arranging memories visually along roads, wordplay, struggling with an onslaught of associations, comments about restaurant music and its effect on food taste, the waking-for-school scene) are directly borrowed from Luria's real life case study of Solomon Shereshevskii, The Mind of a Mnemonist.

The film was screened in the Un Certain Regard section at the 1999 Cannes Film Festival.

Cast
 Tadanobu Asano - Asano Takashi
 Kevin Sherlock - Kevin
 Mavis Xu - Susie
 Takanori Kubo - Asano Takashi (Boy)
 Christa Hughes - Christa
 Georgina Dobson - Georgina

References

External links
 

1999 films
Hong Kong independent films
Hong Kong LGBT-related films
1990s Cantonese-language films
1990s Japanese-language films
1990s English-language films
Films directed by Christopher Doyle
Japanese independent films
1999 directorial debut films
1990s Japanese films
1990s Hong Kong films